Autrecourt-et-Pourron is a commune in the Ardennes department in the Grand Est region of northern France.

The inhabitants of the commune are known as Autrecourtois or Autrecourtoises.

Geography
Autrecourt-et-Pourron is located some 19 km south-east of Sedan and 6 km north-west of Mouzon. Access to the commune is by the D4 road from Remilly-Aillicourt in the north which passes through the commune and the village and continues south to join the D30 west of Beaumont-en-Argonne. The D27 road branches east off the D6 just north of Raucourt-et-Flaba and passes through the commune and the village before continuing south-east to join the D19 west of Mouzon. A railway line passes through the village but there is no station with the nearest station at Mouzon. West of the village the commune has large areas of forest but the east and south are mostly farmland.

The Meuse river forms the north-eastern border of the commune as it flows north-west. The Ruisseau de Brouhan rises towards the west of the commune and flows east through the village to join the Meuse. The Ruisseau de Yoncq forms the south-eastern border of the commune as it flows north-east to join the Meuse.

Neighbouring communes and villages

Heraldry

Administration

List of Successive Mayors

Demography
In 2017 the commune had 342 inhabitants. The population data given in the table and graph below for 1821 and earlier refer to the former commune of Autrecourt.

Culture and heritage

Civil heritage
The commune has two buildings that are registered as historical monuments:
A former Arms Factory (1787)
A former Chateau (17th century)

Religious heritage
The Church of Saint-Victor contains two items that are registered as historical objects:
A Credence Table (18th century)
The Altar, Retable, and Painting: Saint John the Baptist (19th century)

See also
Communes of the Ardennes department

References

External links
Autrecourt-et-Pourron on the old IGN website 
Autrecourt-et-Pourron on Géoportail, National Geographic Institute (IGN) website 
Auirecourt on the 1750 Cassini Map

Communes of Ardennes (department)